Cuthonella norvegica is a species of sea slug, an aeolid nudibranch, a marine gastropod mollusc in the family Cuthonellidae.

Distribution
This species was described from Norway.

References 

Cuthonellidae
Gastropods described in 1929